Beechfield is a neighborhood in the Southwest District of  Baltimore, located between Yale Heights (east) and the Baltimore County line (west). Its population in 2008 was estimated at 3,789.

The community's boundaries form an inverted pyramid shape, with Frederick Avenue (north) drawing a line across the top from Baltimore County (west) to South Beechfield Avenue (east). Frederick Avenue, Maryland Route 144, becomes Frederick Road as it continues west into Baltimore County. Beechfield's eastern boundary begins at the intersection of Beechfield Avenue and Frederick Avenue (north) to the point where the Baltimore County line crosses Beechfield Avenue (south), the apex of the Beechfield pyramid.

Significant landmarks
 Baltimore National Cemetery, 5501 Frederick Avenue.
 Regional Institute for Children and Adolescents, 605 S. Chapelgate Lane, a state-operated psychiatric hospital for children.

Public transportation
After passing through Yale Heights on its way from Dundalk to Catonsville, the MTA Citylink Purple line turns north onto Beechfield Avenue from Cedar Garden Road. It turns left onto Frederick Avenue, then heads west along Route 144 into Baltimore County.

Quickbus Route 46 stops at Beechfield Avenue and Thornfield Avenue in Beechfield while traveling between the Paradise Avenue loop and the Cedonia loop. It operates only on weekdays, from 5 a.m. to 6 p.m.

The UMBC shuttle bus makes five stops along Beechfield's east and north boundaries.

References

External links
  Beechfield Community and Improvement Association

Neighborhoods in Baltimore
Southwest Baltimore